Shifting Sands is a 1922 American silent drama film directed by Fred LeRoy Granville and starring Peggy Hyland, Louis Willoughby and Valia.

Cast
 Peggy Hyland as Barbara Thayer
 Louis Willoughby as Dr. WillardLindsay 
 Valia as Yvonne Lindsay
 Richard Atwood as Pierre Moreau
 Gibson Gowland as Samuel Thayer
 Tony Melford as Leroy Lindsay, age 4
 Douglas Webster as Leroy Linsay, age 14

References

Bibliography
 Munden, Kenneth White. The American Film Institute Catalog of Motion Pictures Produced in the United States, Part 1. University of California Press, 1997.

External links
 

1922 films
1922 drama films
1920s English-language films
American silent feature films
Silent American drama films
American black-and-white films
Films directed by Fred LeRoy Granville
Films distributed by W. W. Hodkinson Corporation
1920s American films